Dickinsoniidae is a taxon of Ediacaran fossils with an airbed-like quilted morphology, sometimes found in association with bizarre trace fossils.  It is placed within the extinct phylum Proarticulata, and contains the defined genera Dickinsonia and probably Windermeria.  Phyllozoon is associated with this family, and is thought to represent ichnofossils of Dickinsonia.

References

Ediacaran life
Prehistoric animal families
Ediacaran first appearances